Stella Johnson (born 1953) is an American photographer.

Her work is included in the collection of the Museum of Fine Arts Houston, and the Portland Art Museum.

References

Living people
1953 births
20th-century American photographers
21st-century American photographers
20th-century American women artists
21st-century American women artists